Wawanesa may refer to:

 Wawanesa, Manitoba, a community in Manitoba, Canada
 The Wawanesa Mutual Insurance Co., a Canadian-based insurance company